Khalid Lachheb (born 16 January 1975) is a retired pole vaulter from France.

He set his personal best (5.80 metres) on 25 August 1998 at a meet in Lausanne. He has a twin brother, Taoufik Lachheb, who is also a former pole vaulter (personal best at 5.72 metres). They were both students at Polytechnique (Paris, France), a well-known institution for engineering.

Achievements

See also
 French all-time top lists - Pole vault

External links
trackfield.brinkster

1975 births
Living people
French male pole vaulters
Universiade medalists in athletics (track and field)
Mediterranean Games bronze medalists for France
Mediterranean Games medalists in athletics
Athletes (track and field) at the 2001 Mediterranean Games
Universiade gold medalists for France
Medalists at the 1997 Summer Universiade